Halla Gunnarsdóttir (8 January 1981) is an Iceland politician and feminist journalist and writer. The former political adviser to the home secretary of Iceland, she is head of policy and partnerships of the Women's Equality Party in the United Kingdom.

Education 
Gunnarsdóttir received a master's degree in international relations from the University of Iceland.

Career 
Gunnarsdóttir worked initially as a journalist from 2003 to 2009, and as an assistant to Ögmundur Jónasson in the Ministry of Health. Gunnarsdóttir was appointed Assistant Attorney to Justice and Human Rights in September 2010. During her term she researched the Icelandic criminal justice system and reviewed how sexual crimes are dealt with. Gunnarsdóttir has also written about security and national defence issues facing Iceland. She is a member of the Feminist Society of Iceland.

Works 
In 2013 Gunnarsdóttir authored an article for The Guardian in which she advocated the porn shield imposed by Iceland as a means to reduce sexual violence in the country.

References

Halla Gunnarsdottir
Halla Gunnarsdottir
1981 births
Living people
Halla Gunnarsdottir
Halla Gunnarsdottir
Halla Gunnarsdottir
21st-century Icelandic women writers 
21st-century Icelandic writers